Tymchenko is a Ukrainian surname. It derives from the Christian name Timothy, and its Ukrainian variant, Tymofiy. The surname, Tymchenko, was created by adding the Ukrainian patronymic suffix, -enko,  meaning someone of Tymofiy, usually the son of Tymofiy. It may refer to the following individuals:

 Ihor Tymchenko (born 1986), Ukrainian footballer
 Ivan Tymchenko (1939–2020), Ukrainian jurist, chairman of the Constitutional Court between 1996 and 1999
 Maksym Tymchenko (born 1975), senior executive in Ukraine
 Oleksiy Tymchenko (born 1985), Ukrainian footballer
 Roksana Tymchenko (born 1991), Ukrainian alpine skier

See also
 
 Timchenko
 Tymoshenko
 Tymoschuk
 Tymchuk

Surnames of Ukrainian origin
Ukrainian-language surnames
Patronymic surnames